Azoricidae is a family of marine sponges belonging to the order of Tetractinellida.

Genera 

Desmascula de Laubenfels, 1950
Jereicopsis Lévi & Lévi, 1983
Leiodermatium Schmidt, 1870

References 

Tetractinellida
Taxa named by William Johnson Sollas